Jean Bellay (12 October 1930 – 9 May 1989) was a French racing cyclist. He rode in the 1954 Tour de France.

References

1930 births
1989 deaths
French male cyclists
Place of birth missing